Huaxi District is one of 6 urban districts of the prefecture-level city of Guiyang, the capital of Guizhou Province, Southwest China.

Its GDP was 4.35 billion RMB in 2006.

It is named after the Huaxi River (the "Flower Brook") that meanders through the town. The North Campus and South Campus of Guizhou University and Guizhou University for Nationalities are located in town. The educational facilities and natural environment make it a renowned educational and cultural center as well as an important tourist destination of Guizhou and southwest China.

Climate

References

External links
Official website of Huaxi District Government
Guiyang Official Website

County-level divisions of Guizhou
Guiyang